The O2 Arena, Greenwich, London, has hosted some of the best known performers, comedy acts and sports teams from around the world. Some of the events that have been held there are listed below.

Entertainment events

Sports events

Tennis

The arena hosted the first ever Turbo Tennis Tournament on 15 September 2007 which was won by Andy Murray. From 2009 until 2020 it was selected as the venue for the ATP World Tour Finals. The venue hosted the 2022 edition of the Laver Cup.

Ice hockey
The arena has also hosted two National Hockey League contests, which started the 2007–08 NHL season, on 29 and 30 September, both involving the Anschutz-owned Los Angeles Kings and their regional rivals from Southern California, the Anaheim Ducks.

Basketball

An NBA exhibition match between the Boston Celtics and the Minnesota Timberwolves took place at the arena on 10 October 2007. The game sold out more than three months beforehand. The arena also hosted the Miami Heat and New Jersey Nets (NBA) pre-season games before the 2008–09 season. Just like the previous NBA exhibition game, tickets for the game sold out three months beforehand.

The Chicago Bulls and the Utah Jazz played an exhibition match on 6 October 2009 in London as part of NBA Europe Live. The Chicago Bulls won the match 102–101 in front of a sell-out crowd.

On 4 October 2010, The Los Angeles Lakers took on the Minnesota Timberwolves. The Timberwolves won the game 111–92 in front of a crowd of 18,689.

The New Jersey Nets defeated the Toronto Raptors on 4 March 2011, by a score of 116–103. The teams met again on 5 March 2011, with a New Jersey Nets victory in 3 overtimes, 137–136. 4 March marked the first time an NBA regular season game has taken place at the O2 Arena.

The Great Britain National Basketball Team have also played several games there, with an attendance of 7,244 for the win over the Czech Republic qualification match for EuroBasket 2009. It is expected this will soon become a home arena for the National Side.

The arena hosted the knockout stage of the men's and women's basketball tournaments during the 2012 Summer Olympics.

A 2012–13 NBA season game took place at the O2 Arena between the Detroit Pistons and the New York Knicks on 17 January 2013. The Knicks won the match 102–87.

A 2014–15 NBA season game took place at the O2 Arena between the Milwaukee Bucks and the New York Knicks on 15 January 2015. The Bucks won the match 95–79.

The arena hosted the 2013 Euroleague Final Four.

In December 2022, the arena will host a college basketball game between the Michigan Wolverines and Kentucky Wildcats.

Gymnastics

It was used for the 2009 World Artistic Gymnastics Championships and hosted artistic gymnastics events at the 2012 Summer Olympics.

Boxing
The first sporting event to take place was the Commonwealth Boxing Lightweight title fight featuring Amir Khan on 14 July 2007.
In March 2008, the arena hosted a match between David Haye and Enzo Maccarinelli, and in November 2008 Haye fought Monte Barrett. 2008 Olympic gold medalist James DeGale fought rival George Groves in May 2011 and the arena hosted the much anticipated rematch between Carl Froch and Mikkel Kessler in May 2013. In January 2016, the arena hosted David Haye's comeback fight in over 3 years promoted by Salter Brothers Entertainment. The arena hosted the inaugural MF & DAZN: X Series event for KSI vs Swarmz & Luis Alcaraz Pineda on 27 August 2022. On 15 October 2022, the arena hosted a boxing match between Claressa Shields and Savannah Marshall that was the first time two female boxers headlined at a major venue in the United Kingdom. Shields won, and the fight headlined the first all-female boxing card in the United Kingdom.

Squash
The arena hosted the British Open 2012, one of the two most prestigious tournaments in the world.

Mixed martial arts
The arena has hosted ten mixed martial arts events promoted by the Ultimate Fighting Championship, including UFC 75: Champion vs. Champion in September 2007, UFC 85: Bedlam in June 2008, UFC 95: Sanchez vs. Stevenson in February 2009, UFC 120: Bisping vs. Akiyama in October 2010, UFC Fight Night: Gustafsson vs. Manuwa in March 2014, UFC Fight Night: Silva vs. Bisping in February 2016, UFC Fight Night: Manuwa vs. Anderson in March 2017, UFC Fight Night: Werdum vs. Volkov in March 2018, UFC Fight Night: Till vs. Masvidal in  March 2019, UFC Fight Night: Volkov vs. Aspinall in March 2022, UFC Fight Night: Blaydes vs. Aspinall in July 2022 and UFC 286: Edwards vs. Usman 3 in March 2023.

UFC 120 featuring Michael Bisping and Yoshirio Akiyama had an attendance of 17,133 breaking the European attendance and gate receipts record which was set by the AO Arena at UFC 105. It was also the biggest box office sporting event in O2 Arena history.

Darts
On 11 February 2010, the O2 Arena hosted the opening night of the Premier League Darts, Britain's biggest indoor sporting event. Fans travelled from all over the UK to see the likes of Phil Taylor, Raymond van Barneveld, Simon Whitlock and James Wade in action. Over 8,000 fans attended the event. In 2010 and 2011, it hosted week 1 and since 2012, it has hosted the play-offs.

Olympics and Paralympics
During the 2012 Summer Olympics it was the venue for gymnastics, for which it had a spectator capacity of 16,500, and for basketball finals, with a capacity of 20,000. During the 2012 Summer Paralympics it was the venue for some wheelchair basketball round robin matches (when the basketball arena at Olympic Park was in use for other matches) and finals, for which it had a capacity of 18,000. Due to IOC sponsorship regulations, it was officially known as North Greenwich Arena during the games. The rest of the basketball and wheelchair basketball competitions took place at an arena in the Olympic Park. A 6,000 seat temporary venue called North Greenwich Arena 2 was to be built nearby to stage the Olympic badminton and rhythmic gymnastics events, but instead these took place at Wembley Arena.

Rugby union
On 29 October 2019, RugbyX will occur at the O2 Arena. RugbyX is an indoor 5v5 rugby union tournament for both men's and women's.

Professional Wrestling
Since 2008, the O2 Arena has regularly hosted professional wrestling events run by the WWE. These events would include their flagship shows Monday Night Raw and Friday Night SmackDown but also non-televised events.

The O2 Arena will host WWE Money In The Bank on July 1, 2023.

Comedy
In May 2008, Chris Rock became the first comedian to play the arena, breaking a Guinness World Record for the largest audience for a comedy show, though this was never an official record and has since been broken by German comedian Mario Barth. Lee Evans, Steve Coogan and The Mighty Boosh all appeared at the arena in 2008, followed by Canadian stand-up Russell Peters in February 2009. High-profile stand-ups Al Murray, Eddie Izzard and Michael Mcintyre have all performed in 2009. Russell Brand performed at the O2 Arena in April 2009; as well as performing stand-up comedy, he recorded several scenes for his new movie Get Him to the Greek, using the audience for his stand-up as a live crowd for a rock concert.

On 30 March 2010, the O2 Arena hosted Channel 4's Comedy Gala, a stand-up comedy benefit show in aid of Great Ormond Street Children's Hospital, in front of 14,000. With over 25 comedians appearing, organiser Channel 4 billed it as "the biggest live stand up show in United Kingdom history".

Some of the UK's most successful comedians are now performing at the O2 Arena during their stand-up tours such as Russell Howard who performed there in his 2011 tour "Right Here, Right Now". Jerry Seinfeld performed a one night only stand-up show at the O2 Arena in 2011. Alan Carr performed his tour "Spexy Beast" in late 2011. Louis C.K. performed there on 20 March 2013.

On 21 November 2013, the five surviving members of Monty Python announced that they would perform a one off reunion show at the arena on 1 July 2014. Another 9 dates were added after the first show sold out in 43 seconds.

Other events
The O2 Arena held the Scout event Live 07 in 2007 to celebration of the centenary of the Scout movement.

The O2 Arena hosted Andrew Reynolds Entrepreneurs Bootcamp – the largest conference event held to date at the venue. Andrew Reynolds Bootcamp broke a UK record with its innovative High Definition projection screen – not only the largest ever used at the O2 Arena – but also the largest indoor screen in the UK. Measuring around 34.5 metres by 12 metres, the huge screen formed the central part of a huge stage set for the Entrepreneurs event which was provided by smyle.co.uk.

The 02 Arena has also held Hillsong Conference every year since 2014.

References

External links
 

Lists of events in the United Kingdom
Events in London
O2 (UK)
Lists of events by venue
History of the Royal Borough of Greenwich